Brigadier-General Hanway Robert Cumming  (9 October 1867 – 5 March 1921) was an officer in the British Army.

Cumming fought in the Second Boer War, and in France during the First World War. He was awarded the Distinguished Service Order in the 1917 Birthday Honours and appointed an Officer in the French Legion of Honour.

During the Irish War of Independence, he was commander of British troops in County Kerry. He was killed at the Clonbanin Ambush, possibly the highest-ranking British officer to be killed in that war.

External links
Profiles of Western Front generals
Cumming's account of service in France

References

1867 births
1921 deaths
Hanway
British military personnel killed in the Irish War of Independence
British Army personnel of the Second Boer War
British Army generals of World War I
Companions of the Distinguished Service Order
Durham Light Infantry officers
Officiers of the Légion d'honneur
British Army brigadiers
British military writers